Desmond Dudwa Phiri, commonly known as D. D. Phiri, (February 23, 1931 – March 24, 2019) was a Malawian author, economist, historian, and playwright. He was born in Mzimba, Malawi, and was the Principal and proprietor of the Aggrey Memorial School in Blantyre. He published 17 books in the fields of history, sociology and economics and was recognized by the Pan-African Writers' Association (PAWA) as one of the top 23 authors in Africa in 2011. He was a regular columnist in The Nation newspaper. He died on 24 March 2019 at Mwaiwathu Private Hospital in Blantyre

Personal life
Phiri was born on 23 February 1931 in Mzimba, Malawi. He went to Blantyre Secondary School and Livingstonia and London. He later moved to England and studied Economics, History, and Sociology at the London School of Economics (part of the University of London). He was accorded with an honorary doctorate by the University of Malawi.

Career
He worked as a diplomat in the foreign service and retired from the civil service in 1976. He was the Principal and Proprietor of Aggrey Memorial School. He was a columnist for The Nation newspaper.

Published works

Books

Biography
Let Us Die for Africa: An African Perspective on the Life and Death of John Chilembwe of Nyasaland - 1999
Charles Chidongo Chinula - 1975
Dunduzu K. Chisiza - 1974
James Frederick Sangala: Founder of the Nyasaland African Congress and Bridge between Patriot John Chilembwe and Ngwazi Dr. H. Kamuzu Banda - 1974
Inkosi Gomani II: Maseko-Ngoni Paramount Chief Who Suffered Martyrdom for His People and Country - 1973

History
From Nguni to Ngoni:A History of the Ngoni Exodus from Zululand and Swaziland to Malawi, Tanzania and Zambia - 1982
 History of Malawi: From Earliest Times to the Year 1915 - January 2004
History of the Tumbuka People - 2000
Democracy with a Price: The History of Malawi since 1900 (co-authors Bakili Muluzi, Yusuf Juwayeyi, Mercy Makhambera) - 1999

Novels (in Tumbuka language)
Mankhwala a Ntchito
Kanakazi Kayaya
Ku Msika wa Vyawaka
Ulanda wa Mavunika

Self-help
 Hints to Private Students
 What the Achievers Teach about Success

Essays
 Malawi Our Future Our Choice: The Selected Essays of D. D. Phiri (co-authors John Williams, Judy Williams) - 2006

Plays
The Chief's Bride

References

See also

1931 births
20th-century Malawian economists
Malawian dramatists and playwrights
Malawian diplomats
Malawian historians
Malawian sociologists
Malawian columnists
2019 deaths
People from Mzimba District
20th-century Malawian writers
21st-century Malawian writers
20th-century Malawian educators
21st-century Malawian educators
Historians of Malawi
Tumbuka-language writers